Huovinen is a Finnish surname. Notable people with the surname include:

 Eero Huovinen (born 1944), Finnish Lutheran bishop
 Susanna Huovinen (born 1972), Finnish politician
 Veikko Huovinen (1927–2009), Finnish novelist and forester

Finnish-language surnames